Schremser is a traditional brewery in Schrems town, Waldviertel region in
Austria, first written record about it is from 1410.

In 1838 Jakob Trojan acquired the Schrems brewery and since then, the company has been family-owned.

In 1875 Theodore Trojan understood the need for a machine-driven brewery and installed a steam engine. Today the beer is naturally brewed to the purity from 1516 and under constant quality tests in the brewery laboratory.

See also 
List of oldest companies

References

External links 
Homepage

Beer in Austria
Drink companies of Austria
Companies established in the 15th century
15th-century establishments in Austria
Breweries in Austria

de:Brauerei Schrems